The Russian Mission School in New York is a Russian overseas school located on the grounds of the Russian Mission Residency in the Riverdale community of Bronx borough of New York City, New York. It is affiliated with the Permanent Mission of the Russian Federation to the United Nations, and is operated by the Russian Ministry of Foreign Affairs.

As of 1986 students from this school had meetings with local high school students.

See also

 Russian Americans in New York City

Anglo-American-Canadian international schools in Russia:
 Anglo-American School of Moscow
 Anglo-American School of St. Petersburg

References

External links
 

Educational institutions in the United States with year of establishment missing
International schools in New York City
Riverdale, Bronx
New York
Russian-American culture in New York City
Private K-12 schools in New York City
Private elementary schools in the Bronx
Private middle schools in the Bronx
Private high schools in the Bronx